The BlackBerry Porsche Design P'9981 was a smartphone by Research In Motion and Porsche Design. Released in December 2011, it was a variant of the latest model of the Bold 9900, sharing all of its internal hardware components. They both shared the same Qualcomm Snapdragon MSM8655 CPU clocked at 1.2 GHz, 768 MB of RAM, a  TFT multi-touch capacitive touchscreen (built on 88μm pixel) with a resolution of 640 x 480 pixels, and the same 5.0-megapixel EDOF rear camera capable of 720p video recording, and an LED flash. The major difference was the exterior case, which included a unibody stainless steel frame and leather rear door. Porsche Design changed the aesthetics of the device by adding a metal QWERTY keyboard laid across four straight rows that were set into the steel frame, each row of keys divided by a space, along with custom menu buttons.

It ran the BlackBerry OS 7 and featured a custom user interface, modified by Porsche Design. Aside from this, the software contained within the device itself was identical to software on the Bold 9900.

References

External links
P'9981 via BlackBerry UK

Personal digital assistants
Information appliances
P9981
Mobile phones with an integrated hardware keyboard
Touchscreen portable media players
Mobile phones introduced in 2011